This is a list of notable massively multiplayer online games (MMOG), sorted by category.

Massively multiplayer online first-person shooter games (MMOFPS)

Massively multiplayer online role-playing games (MMORPG)

Massively multiplayer online real-time strategy games (MMORTS)

Massively multiplayer online turn-based strategy games

Action 

 Armored Warfare
 Cartoon Network Universe: FusionFall
 CrimeCraft
 DC Universe Online
 Infantry Online
 Starport: Galactic Empires
 SubSpace
 World of Tanks
 World of Warships
 World of Warplanes
 War Thunder

Browser games 

 Agar.io
 Bin Weevils
 Blood Wars
 Castle of Heroes
 Club Penguin
 Command & Conquer: Tiberium Alliances
 Dark Orbit
 Empire & State
 Hattrick
 Ikariam
 Illyriad
 Imperia Online
 Little Space Heroes
 Lord of Ultima
 Miniconomy
 National Geographic Animal Jam
 NEO Shifters
 Ogame
 Omerta
 Pardus
 Pirate Galaxy
 Poptropica
 Planetarion
 Realm of the Mad God
 Runes of Magic
 Samurai Taisen
 Sentou Gakuen
 Slither.io
 Smallworlds
 Surviv.io
 Tenvi
 Terra Militaris
 TirNua
 Transformice
 Travian
 Tribal Wars
 Twin Skies
 Urban Dead
 World of the Living Dead: Resurrection

Browser games with 3D rendering 

 Battlestar Galactica Online
 Dark Orbit (Since 2015)
 Dead Frontier
 Family Guy Online
 Fragoria
 Free Realms
 RuneScape
 Tanki Online

Building games 

 Active Worlds

 Wurm Online

Exploration 

 Uru Live

Puzzle 

 Yohoho! Puzzle Pirates

Social games 

 Active Worlds
 Bin Weevils
 EGO
 Flyff
 Free Realms
 Furcadia
 Habbo
 Nicktropolis
 OurWorld
 Red Light Center
 Roblox
 Second Life
 The Sims Online
 SmallWorlds
Tanki Online
 There
 TirNua
 Toontown Online
 Transformice
 Virtual Magic Kingdom
 Virtual World of Kaneva
 vSide
 Wizard 101
 Pirate101
 National Geographic Animal Jam
 Woozworld
 Star Wars: The Old Republic

Space simulation 

 Dual Universe
 Elite Dangerous
 Eve Online

See also 
 List of free massively multiplayer online games
 List of free multiplayer online games
 Multiplayer video game
 Massively multiplayer online role-playing game (MMORPG)
 Browser based game
 Chronology of MUDs

MMOGs
list
games Massively multiplayer online

it:Massively multiplayer online game